Rosemary Nixon is a Canadian author and novelist. Her stories have appeared in literary magazines across the country and in numerous anthologies.

Biography 
Nixon has lived in Belgium, France, the Democratic Republic of Congo, and Spain. She has worked for years as a freelance consultant for the Calgary Board of Education, working with educators regarding the position of literature in the classroom. In addition to freelance work, she has taught classes at the University of Calgary, and Chinook College.

Nixon has worked extensively in the position of writer-in-residence across Canada. She was awarded the 1996-97 Canadian Writer-in-Residency for the Markin-Flanagan Distinguished Writers Programme at the University of Calgary, Alberta. She served as Writer-in Residence at the University of Windsor, Ontario in 2010-2011. In 2011, Nixon was a judge for the CBC Short Story Prize. She was The Canadian Author Association Writer-in-Residence for Southern Alberta in the autumn of 2012. She was Writer-in-Residence at the Saskatoon Public Library, Saskatchewan in 2013-2014. She has the position of Writer-in-Residence at Calgary's Memorial Park Library for the autumn term of 2014.

Nixon lives in Calgary, Alberta.

Selected bibliography 
 Are you ready to be Lucky? (2013)
 Kalila (2011)
 The Cock’s Egg (1994)
 Mostly Country (1991)

Awards and honours 
Her collection Mostly Country was shortlisted for the Howard O’Hagan Award. Her collection The Cock’s Egg won the Howard O’Hagan Award. Her novel Kalila was shortlisted for the Georges Bugnet Award.

References 

Year of birth missing (living people)
Living people
Canadian women novelists
Writers from Calgary